State v. Stone is a popular mock trial case published by the National Institute for Trial Advocacy.  Set in the fictional town of "Nita City", the case is about a man named James Stone who is charged with the rape of a 21-year-old college student named Marilyn Miller.

Facts of the Case 

On a December afternoon in Nita City, the police receive a call from a 21-year-old college student named Marilyn Miller, who explains that a man broke into her apartment and raped her.  Miller is taken in for medical treatment, which confirms forcible rape, and on the ride back to her apartment she tells the police officer that she remembers seeing her attacker before.  Miller explains that the previous night, she was at a bar called "Rocco's" where she had an encounter with a twenty-something male who grabbed her hand and said "you need some loving."  She tells the officer that this man was the one who attacked her.

Police find a small blue book in Marilyn Miller's apartment, which they trace to a 28-year-old man with a criminal record named James Stone.  The book was a notebook used and carried around by Stone.  Stone is subsequently arrested; at his residence, police find clothing matching Miller's description of what the attacker wore.  The police show Miss Miller a series of photographs, one of which is Stone's, asking if she can identify her attacker. Miller states that she thinks the photograph of Stone is her attacker, but wants to see him in person to be sure.  A police officer then takes her to James Stone's arraignment, where he is escorted before the judge in the courtroom.  Upon seeing James Stone, Marilyn Miller confirms that he was the one who attacked her.

James Stone admits that he was the one said "you need some loving" to Marilyn Miller at Rocco's the previous night, but he denies that he raped her, and insists that he lost his blue book at the bar. James Stone's friends, Thomas Mitchell and Edward Lindsay, testify for him as alibi witnesses, saying that they were with Stone at the Nita University cafeteria around the time the attack took place. James Stone also insists that he is happily married, though some evidence suggests that he was unhappy in his relationship with his wife and that he had a rather strong sexual desire.

Important facts tending to incriminate James Stone 

 Marilyn Miller identified Stone as her attacker.
 Stone's blue notebook was found at Miller's apartment.
 Stone had clothing matching the description of the attacker given by Miller, including a red bandana that Miller said her attacker wore over his face.
 Stone has a criminal record.

Common defenses to these 

 Marilyn Miller didn't identify Stone as her attacker until the ride back to her apartment, which was after she had been given medication.
 Stone claims he lost the blue book at Rocco's and that she must have taken it home with her.  A waitress from Rocco's testifies that she saw James Stone and his friends searching for something at the end of the night.  However, they never told her at the time what they were searching for.
 The clothing worn by the attacker was not particularly uncommon for a person to have.
 Stone's past criminal record involves a burglary and an incident where he drove the getaway car in an armed robbery; nothing on the order of rape.

Witnesses 

There are a total of ten witness characters in the case.

Witnesses for the State 

Marilyn Miller.  The woman who accuses James Stone of raping her.

Detective Wasilewski.  The detective who led the investigation of the rape.

Dr. Madden.  The OB/GYN who treated Marilyn Miller.

Diana Samuels.  A woman with whom James Stone was having an affair.  Her note to her therapist suggests that Stone had very strong sexual urges.

Officer Pace.  The police officer who responded to the rape call.

Witnesses for the Defense 

James Stone.  The defendant.

Florence Stone.  James Stone's wife, who defends his good and moral character.

Edward Lindsey.  A friend of Stones, who claims he was with him around the time of the rape.

Thomas Mitchell.  Another friend of stones who also claims to have been with him around the time of the rape.

Esther Boothe.  A waitress who testifies that she saw James Stone and his friends searching for something before they left Rocco's on the night before the rape.

Aspects of the Case 

Like most cases designed for mock trials, State v. Stone has many nuances.

Character of James Stone 

James Stone is designed to be a "scum of the earth" type of character, a man with a multiple felony convictions who is cheating on his wife, and who would accost a young girl in a bar and tell her "you need some loving."  Indeed, his very name "Stone" seems to be something of a character pun, much like his counterpart "John Diamond", the unblemished police officer and former Marine who is the defendant in the NITA case State v. Diamond.  An important part of the defense's case is the rehabilitation of Stone's character, or alternatively, keeping this out of the case.

The Blue Book 

There is no dispute that the blue notebook belonging to James Stone was found inside Marilyn Miller's apartment.  According to the prosecution's theory of the case, Stone accidentally dropped it there when he raped Miller.

The defense is thus shouldered with offering an alternate explanation for how the book ended up in Miller's apartment. A popular argument is that she somehow accidentally took it home with her from Rocco's the previous night; perhaps it was dropped in her purse when Stone accosted her, or that she took it back thinking it was hers, and forgot after being given medication after her rape.

Marilyn Miller's Apartment 

An important hole for the prosecution to fill is how James Stone found Marilyn Miller's apartment.  Miller lived in a multiple-dwelling residence, with doors leading to two different apartments inside of a main door (one upstairs, one downstairs).  Miller testified that she heard a crash and that the next thing she knew, her rapist was standing in the doorway.  Her rapist thus must have known which apartment inside the building was hers.

One theory might be that James Stone followed Miller home, and after she entered her apartment building, saw her turn on the light  through the window - indicating that Marilyn lived in the upstairs apartment in the building.

Witness Credibility versus Alibi Strength 

Thomas Mitchell and Edward Lindsey both testify that they were with James Stone at a cafeteria around noon on the day of the rape.  The victim call and reported the rape at 12:45 p.m., meaning that Mitchell's testimony still leaves time, albeit not much, for James Stone to have potentially committed the rape.

Both sides have something of a dilemma with Mitchell and Lindsey because, on one hand, if their testimony still leaves room for Stone to commit the crime, then this makes their testimony more reliable.  If Thomas Mitchell and Edward Lindsey were lying to protect Stone and give him an alibi, then logically, they would alibi him for the entire time period.  The fact that their testimony doesn't completely exonerate Stone suggests that Mitchell and Lindsey are telling the truth.  On the other hand, if their alibi is imperfect, then it still leaves room for the crime to be committed.

Both sides should ideally argue for their version of the facts under both potential sets of facts.  In other words, the prosecution should ideally argue that, either Mitchell and Lindsey are being untruthful - meaning that their testimony doesn't exonerate Stone - or that they are being truthful, but the alibi they present is imperfect.

DNA Evidence 

State v. Stone was written before DNA was widely used as evidence, and there is no discussion of any attempt to recover genetic material from the victim in the original publication.  Some courses and competitions may add the fact that no material containing DNA was discovered or that the case should be considered as though genetic testing has not yet been developed.

Legal education